XHDGO-FM / XEDGO-AM is a Regional Mexican music radio station branded as "La Mejor 103.7" that serves the state of Durango.

It used to be a classic hits radio station branded as "La Super Grupera".

History
XEDGO signed on in 1966. It gained its FM counterpart in 1994 as part of the first wave of licensed AM-FM combos.

References

External links
 Official website
 La Mejor 103.7
 FCC information for XEDGO
 La Mejor Durango Facebook

Regional Mexican radio stations
Radio stations in Durango
Mass media in Durango City